Jill Orbinson (born 13 September 1978) is a former Ireland women's field hockey international. Between 1998 and 2007 she made 139 senior appearances for Ireland. She represented Ireland at the 2002 Women's Hockey World Cup. She also played senior club field hockey for Pegasus in the Women's Irish Hockey League.

Domestic teams

Portadown
Orbinson was a Portadown player when she made her senior Ireland debut.

Pegasus
In 2006–07 Orbison was a member of the Pegasus team that won an Irish Senior Cup and All Ireland Club Championship double. In 2007–08 she was also a member of the Pegasus team that won both the Ulster Shield and the Irish Senior Cup. In the Shield final she scored the second goal in a 3–0 win against Ballymoney.

Ireland international
Orbinson made her senior debut for Ireland against Scotland in 1998. In July 2002 she made her 50th senior appearance for Ireland against Poland in a qualifier for the 2003 Women's EuroHockey Nations Championship. She marked the occasion by scoring two goals in a 4–0 win. Between 1998 and 2007 she made 139 senior appearances for Ireland.

Employment
Orbinson has worked as a physiotherapist.

Honours
Pegasus
Women's Irish Hockey League
Winners: 2010–11
Irish Senior Cup
Winners: 2006–07, 2007–08
Runners-up: 2009 
Ulster Shield
Winners: 2005–06, 2007–08, 2008–09 
All-Ireland Club Championship
Winners: 2007
Runners-up: 2006

References

1968 births
Living people
Ireland international women's field hockey players
Female field hockey players from Northern Ireland
Irish female field hockey players
British female field hockey players
Women's Irish Hockey League players
Female field hockey midfielders
Female field hockey defenders
Sportspeople from County Down
People from Banbridge
Irish physiotherapists
People educated at Portadown College